Miguel Santiago "Mike" Roche (born June 27, 1953) is an American middle-distance runner. He competed in the men's 3000 metres steeplechase at the 1976 Summer Olympics. Roche was a 1975 NCAA All-American in the 3000 steeplechase while attending Rutgers University. He was ranked in the top 10 US Steeplechasers from 1975 to 1980. In 1978, Roche was a member of the silver medal-winning US International Cross Country team competing in Glasgow, Scotland. On July 4, 1978, Roche beat 12,000 runners at the Peachtree Road Race in Atlanta, GA, setting a new course record (28:59)in the process. In March 1981, Roche established a new American Record for 10 miles with a time of 46:57 at Cherry Hill, NJ. The record would stand for 2 years.

References

External links
 

1953 births
Living people
Athletes (track and field) at the 1976 Summer Olympics
American male middle-distance runners
American male steeplechase runners
Olympic track and field athletes of the United States
Rutgers Scarlet Knights men's track and field athletes